Li Quan or Quan Li may refer to:

People with the surname Li
Li Quan (Taoist), Tang dynasty Taoist
Li Quan (general) (died 1231), rebel leader during the Jin dynasty
Li Quan (martial artist) (born 1973), Chinese martial artist
Li Quan (rower), Chinese rower

People with the surname Quan
Li Quan (wildlife conservationist), UK-based Chinese wildlife conservationist